Lamia or  Lamyae  or Lamiya is a feminine given name borne in Libyan-Greek mythology by a Libyan queen that transformed into a mythological creature. In Arabic it has been derived from the word which means "shining" or "radiant." The Bosnian form of name is Lamija.  Lamija was the most popular name for newborn girls in Bosnia and Herzegovina in 2012.

Notable persons with the given name

Lamia
Lamia Assi (born 1955), Syrian politician
Lamia Bahnasawy (born 1984), Egyptian archer
Lamia Joreige, Lebanese visual artist and filmmaker
Lamia Makaddam (born 1971), Tunisian poet, journalist, translator
Lamia Moubayed Bissat (born 1967), Lebanese public servant and advocate
Lamia Ziade (born 1968), Lebanese illustrator and visual artist
Lamia Al-Gailani Werr (1938-2019), Iraqi archeologist

Lamiya
Lamiya Haji Bashar, Yezidi human rights activist
Lamiya Abed Khadawi (?-2005), Iraqi politician and Member of Parliament

Notes

Arabic feminine given names
Bosnian feminine given names
Pakistani feminine given names